Terana is a fungal genus in the family Phanerochaetaceae. It is a monotypic genus, containing the single species Terana caerulea, a widespread crust fungus.

References

Phanerochaetaceae
Monotypic Polyporales genera